Canziani is an Italian surname. Notable people with the surname include:

Estella Canziani (1887–1964), British painter, interior decorator, writer and folklorist
Giovanni Battista Canziani (1664–1730), Italian Baroque painter
Héctor Canziani, Argentine poet, screenwriter and film director

Italian-language surnames